Pedro J. del Nido is an American pediatric cardiac surgeon who was the 95th president of the American Association for Thoracic Surgery (AATS), succeeding David J. Sugarbaker and preceding Joseph S. Coselli.

Education 
Del Nido completed medical school at University of Wisconsin Medical School, 1977, Madison, Wisconsin, his residency in General Surgery at Boston University 1982, Boston, Massachusetts, Residency in Cardiothoracic Surgery at Toronto General Hospital 1985, Toronto, Canada,  and Fellowship in Pediatric Cardiothoracic Surgery at Hospital for Sick Children, 1986, Toronto, Canada.

Cardioplegia 
Del Nido is the eponym of the del Nido cardioplegia, an intraoperative solution infused during open-heart surgery to temporarily stop the heart from beating. Del Nido developed the solution while working at the University of Pittsburgh in the early 1990s, for which he subsequently received his first National Institutes of Health grant in 1992. While the del Nido cardioplegia was initially developed for use in pediatric patients, its use has gained popularity in adult cardiac surgery.

Referencees

Living people
American cardiac surgeons
20th-century American physicians
21st-century American physicians
University of Wisconsin School of Medicine and Public Health alumni
Boston University alumni
Year of birth missing (living people)